Bernard Ronald Wolfe (born December 18, 1951) is a Canadian businessman and former professional ice hockey player. Wolfe played 120 games over four seasons in the National Hockey League.

Early life
Wolfe was born in Montreal, Quebec, Canada, and is Jewish. His mother, Fay Wolfe, observed upon his becoming a NHL hockey player: "Of course I would have preferred him to be a doctor, or some kind of professional man. But if Bernie is happy, then we're happy." His father, Mickey, had played goaltender for the Canadian Army team. He attended, majored in financial management, and played hockey at Sir George Williams University in Montreal, where he was named the school's top male athlete. Playing for Sir George Williams, he was a Quebec University Athletic Association First Team All-Star goaltender in 1972 and 1974, and a CIAU First Team All-Star in 1974. Later, while he was playing in the NHL, he took courses at George Washington University.

Biography
Signed as a free agent in 1975 by the Washington Capitals, Wolfe played for four seasons before retiring in November 1979 at age 27. Playing in 40 games for the Capitals during the 1975-76 season, he set club records for seasonal goals against average (4.16) and consecutive scoreless minutes (80:43). He showed flashes of brilliance and was a solid performer on a team that struggled in those early years. A former all-Canadian goalie in college, Wolfe was cool under pressure with a poor team in hockey's most difficult position. He retired with one year remaining on his guaranteed contract, saying he "just didn't enjoy it anymore". In 120 games, his record was 20-61-21, with 424 goals against, a 4.17 goals against average, and one shutout.

Wolfe retired from professional hockey in 1979 and began a financial planning practice. He earned his Certified Financial Planner designation in 1981. Bernard R. Wolfe & Associates Inc., which in 2014 managed $14 billion in assets, was recognized in 2009 and 2010 by Washingtonian Magazine as one of the Washington, D.C. area's top financial planning firms as voted by its peers.

In 1992 when he was 40 years old, the Capitals attempted to re-sign him in order to make him the goaltender they would expose in the 1992 NHL Expansion Draft. League rules required every team to make a goalie  available for the draft who had at least one game of NHL experience.  Wolfe agreed to sign for the league minimum salary of $100,000; he promised to donate his salary to charity if his contract were approved by the league, but it never was. The attempt was immediately denied by the NHL for obvious reasons; Wolfe had long retired from the NHL and was well into his career as a financial planner. Phil Esposito, who had recently become part owner of the expansion Tampa Bay Lightning, was quoted as saying about the incident: "I didn't just pay $50 million for Bernie Wolfe.  He wasn't any good when I played against him". Since the Capitals were unwilling to expose any of their current goaltenders, they eventually signed Steve Weeks for that purpose.

Wolfe also co-wrote a book, How to Watch Ice Hockey, with journalist Mitch Henkin.

Wolfe was the president of the Washington Capitals Alumni Association from 1992 to 2007. In 1999, he had both of his hips replaced.

See also
List of select Jewish ice hockey players

References

External links
 
 Bernard R. Wolfe & Associates, Inc.
 Washingtonian Magazine 2009

1951 births
Anglophone Quebec people
Canadian ice hockey goaltenders
Ice hockey people from Montreal
Jewish Canadian sportspeople
Jewish ice hockey players
Living people
Undrafted National Hockey League players
Washington Capitals players